Pandora Gibson-Gomez (born 21 June 1941) was a Bahamian comedian and storyteller known for her imitation of the Eleuthera dialect.

Early life and career

Gibson was born Pandora Iona Bethel in Eleuthera in June 1941 to Leopold and Naomi (née Farrington) Bethel. Her father died later that year in November 1941 and her mother later remarried.

She was an actor and performer for concerts and shows. She was also deputy headmistress at Queen's College, Nassau.

Death and legacy

She died at the age of 47. The Pandora Gibson-Gomez Award for Excellence in Drama is named for her.

Discography
GBI Recording LP-109 (1976) Pandora Gibson / Blind Blake: A Cultural Experience
Side A: Pandora Gibson (indigenous Bahamian comedy)
 Jonah Swallowed The Whale
 Jesus The Son Of God Do
 The Shilling
 Under Mervin
 Prayer Time
 Aunt Elizabeth
 Good Friday
 The Rape
 Unity
Side B: LP's reverse side is by Blind Blake

References

External links
 The Government of the Bahamas (FAQ about Pandora Gibson-Gomez)
 Illustrated Pandora Gibson discography

People from Nassau, Bahamas
Year of death missing
1941 births